John Tomlin may refer to:

John Tomlin, student killed in the Columbine High School massacre
John Tomlin (American football), former football coach
John Read le Brockton Tomlin, British malacologist
Tommy Tomlin (John Albert Tomlin), American football player

See also
John Tomlinson (disambiguation)